Sheykh Taqqeh (also Romanized as Sheykh Taqeh; also known as Shaikh Tāfeh, Sheikh Tagheh, Sheykh Taqī, and Sheykh Tāvez) is a village in Yalghuz Aghaj Rural District, Serishabad District, Qorveh County, Kurdistan Province, Iran. At the 2006 census, its population was 163, in 37 families. The village is populated by Kurds.

References 

Towns and villages in Qorveh County
Kurdish settlements in Kurdistan Province